Mandjeck is a surname. Notable people with the surname include:

Cédric Mandjeck (born 1993), Cameroonian footballer
Georges Mandjeck (born 1988), Cameroonian footballer